Toontje Van Lankvelt  (born 1 July 1984) is a Canadian male volleyball player. He was part of the Canada men's national volleyball team at the 2014 FIVB Volleyball Men's World Championship in Poland. He is currently playing for Hyundai Capital in Korea, but has played for a variety of other European teams throughout his professional career.

Sporting Achievements

Clubs

National Championships

 2010  Austrian Volley League, with Posoljilnica Aich / Dob
 2011   Volleyliga Belgium, with VC Lennik

National Team

 2011  NORCECA Championship
 2013  NORCECA Championship
 2015  Pan American Games
 2015  NORCECA Championship

References

1984 births
Canadian men's volleyball players
Volleyball players at the 2015 Pan American Games
Pan American Games bronze medalists for Canada
Living people
Expatriate volleyball players in Poland
Pan American Games medalists in volleyball
Jastrzębski Węgiel players
Medalists at the 2015 Pan American Games